Branislav Jasurek (born in 1982) is a Slovakian former professional footballer who played as a midfielder or winger.

References

1982 births
Living people
Slovak footballers
Association football wingers
MŠK Žilina players
KFC Uerdingen 05 players
VfB Oldenburg players
FK Ventspils players
FK Žalgiris players
AS Trenčín players
Slovak expatriate footballers
Slovak expatriate sportspeople in Germany
Expatriate footballers in Germany
Slovak expatriate sportspeople in Lithuania
Expatriate footballers in Lithuania
Slovak expatriate sportspeople in the Czech Republic
Expatriate footballers in the Czech Republic